Lewis Josselyn, (September 13, 1883 – March 14, 1964), was an American portrait, landscape, and community photographer and early resident of Carmel-by-the-Sea, California. He was the official photographer for the Forest Theater, a historic amphitheater in Carmel.

Early life
Josselyn was born on September 13, 1883, in National City, California, in southwestern San Diego County, California. He was the son of Charles L. Josselyn (1850–1917) of Worcester, Massachusetts and Alice R. Lamb (1865–?). He received his early education in San Diego and went to the Boston Art School. Josselyn moved with his family to Carmel in 1914. He was in World War I and served overseas (1917–1919). He married Augustine Eugenie Richard (1896–1987) on February 24, 1920, in Manhattan, New York City. They had no children.

Career

Josselyn was a pioneer in the early days of Carmel. His photographs are recognized as a record of Carmel's historical past. He photographed plays at the Forest Theater, Theatre of the Golden Bough, the Bixby Creek Bridge, Hotel Del Monte, and the Carmel Mission.

On September 27, 1924, he photographed the famous fire that destroyed the large resort Hotel Del Monte in Monterey, California. The hotel was rebuilt and later became the Naval Postgraduate School. In 1924, Josselyn photographed Edward G. Kuster's Theatre of the Golden Bough, including the auditorium's 38-foot-wide stage.

In the mid-1920s to the mid-1940s, Josselyn worked with the artist, sculpturist Jo Mora to photograph and capture his Pebble Beach, California studio and the artwork he created there. Josselyn was also a family friend who photographed Mora's at various locations, including the design of a half-dollar to commemorate the 75th anniversary of California statehood; Mora playing the title role in Bad Man at the Carmel Playhouse; and the at the Statue of Junípero Serra in Carmel Woods in 1922.

In the 1920s, Josselyn was on the Abalone League team where he became close friends with Col. S. B. Dutton, Jo Mora, By Ford, Sam Morse, Jimmie Hopper and Ted Kuster.

Works
Josselyn photographed the following:

Death
Josselyn died, from a stroke, on March 14, 1964, in his home at Santa Rita Street & 7th Avenue, Carmel-by-the-Sea, California, at the age of 80. Funeral services were held at the Little Chapel-by-the-Sea with the American Legion Post 41 officiating. Inurnment, with military rites, took place at the Golden Gate National Cemetery in San Bruno, California.

Legacy

Since Josselyn's death, his sister-in-law Florence Josselyn exhibited hundreds of his photos of Carmel, from the 1920 and 1930s, at the Marjorie Evans Gallery at the Sunset Center in 1973. The name of the exhibit was the "The Carmel of Lewis Josselyn." Many photos are of scenes before the streets were paved, the dedication of the Carmel-by-the-Sea World War I Memorial Arch, and the Abalone League.

In 1970, Josselyn's widow, Jeanne Josselyn, donated over 3,800 original glass plates and film negatives to Pat Hathaway, a photo archivist. The Monterey County Historical Society called Hathaway's archive "a valuable resource for historians, scholars, writers, journalists, reporters, teachers and students."

In 1981, Tom Leyde, editor of the The Californian, wrote about the Josselyn's negatives that were archieved in the Pat Hathaway Collection, which includes photos of Carmel poet Robinson Jeffers in front of his Hawk Tower (1925), and the restoration of the Carmel Mission (1919).

In 2009, Micahel Kenneth Hemp, wrote the book Cannery Row, which describes the history of Cannery Row with photographs by Josselyn, that include photographs of the Point Lobos Canning Company (1916), Monterey Bay storm (1919), Hotel Del Monte fire (1924), Street scene at Lighthouse Avenue, Pacific Grove (1932), and Abalone divers and shells (1930s).

Gallery

See also
 Timeline of Carmel-by-the-Sea, California

External links

 A San Francisco viewbook and photographs of historic buildings of Monterey
 California missions, towns, and buildings: pictorial material from the Aubrey Drury papers
 Finding Aid to the Save the Redwoods League photograph collection. 1885–2014

References

1883 births
1964 deaths
Photographers from California
People from National City, California
20th-century American photographers
20th-century American male artists
American military personnel of World War I
Burials at Golden Gate National Cemetery
Massachusetts College of Art and Design alumni